The 2000 PBA All-Star Game is the annual All-Star Weekend of the Philippine Basketball Association (PBA). The first out-of-town All-Star game was held on August 13, 2000 at the San Agustin Gym in Iloilo City.

PBA All-Stars vs ABC Selection
A week before the PBA Annual All-Star game, an exhibition match took place on August 6 at the Philsports Arena, featuring a PBA selection going up against the Asia's finest, some of the best players in the Asian Basketball Confederation. The PBA All-Stars won easily, 101-81. Johnny Abarrientos was voted MVP of the ABC-PBA All-Star Extravaganza.

Rosters

PBA All-Stars:
Johnny Abarrientos
Marlou Aquino
Noy Castillo
Kenneth Duremdes
Rudy Hatfield
Bong Hawkins
Danny Ildefonso
Eric Menk
Alvin Patrimonio
Rodney Santos
Andy Seigle
Danny Seigle
Coach: Tim Cone

ABC Selection:
Rommel Adducul (From Manila Metrostars in the MBA)
Gong Xiaobin (China)
Zhu Dong (China)
Cheng Chi Lung (Taiwan)
Eli McHantaf (Lebanon)
Fadi El Khatib (Lebanon)
Mohamed Islau-Ud-Din (India)
R.S. Robinson (India) 
Osamah Mubarak (Kuwait)
Lo Shin Liang (Taiwan)
Makoto Hasegawa (Japan)
Ali Al-Maghrabi (Saudi Arabia)
Coach: Ghassan Sarkis (Lebanon)

Game

PBA-ABC Side Attraction
Slam Dunk Competition: Mobiline's Don Camaso won over Indian R.S Robinson in the finals, 45-43.   
Buzzerbeater event: Edward Naron of Brgy.Ginebra scored on a lay-up in the finals to outshoot Mobiline's Patrick Fran and Purefoods' Jessie Cabanayan.
Three-Point Shootout: Purefoods guard Boyet Fernandez edged out Chinese-Taipei's Lo Shin Liang, 21-19, in the finals.
Two-Ball Competition: Mobiline's Victor Pablo and Gherome Ejercito prevailed by scoring 64 points in the finals against the 39 points of the Purefoods tandem of Rey Evangelista and Rommel Daep.

All-Star Game

Rosters

Veterans:
Marlou Aquino (Sta.Lucia)
Jeffrey Cariaso (Tanduay)
Kenneth Duremdes (Alaska)
Vergel Meneses (Brgy.Ginebra)
Benjie Paras (Shell)
Alvin Patrimonio (Purefoods)
Olsen Racela (San Miguel)
Rodney Santos (Alaska)
Coach: Alfrancis Chua (Tanduay)

Rookies-Sophomores-Juniors:
Gherome Ejercito (Mobiline)
Davonn Harp (Red Bull)
Rudy Hatfield (Tanduay)
Dondon Hontiveros (Tanduay)
Danny Ildefonso (San Miguel)
Eric Menk (Tanduay)
Ali Peek (Sunkist)
Mark Telan (Shell)
Jimwell Torion (Red Bull)
Coach:

Game

The Veterans unleashed an unbelievable 25-0 run in the last eight minutes to turn back the RSJ squad, 93-78. Vergel Meneses was named the MVP of the All-Star Game, his third MVP award in the mid-season spectacle.

References

All-Star Weekend
Philippine Basketball Association All-Star Weekend
PBA All-Star Weekend 2000